

Films

References

LGBT
1998 in LGBT history
1998